Nemognatha is a genus of blister beetles in the family Meloidae. There are at least 20 described species in Nemognatha.

Species

References

Further reading

 
 
 

Meloidae